Vitaly Viktorovich Shevchenko (born 2 October 1951) is a Russian coach and former Soviet footballer. His last work was head-coach of FC Rotor Volgograd. He finished the Institute of Physical Education (Kyiv) and the Supreme school of coaches in Moscow.

References

External links
 Short Biography 
 Profile
 

1951 births
Living people
Azerbaijani footballers
Soviet footballers
Soviet Union international footballers
Soviet Top League players
FC Dynamo Kyiv players
FC Lokomotiv Moscow players
Azerbaijani football managers
FC Metalurh Donetsk managers
Soviet football managers
FC Chornomorets Odesa players
Club Bolívar managers
Hapoel Be'er Sheva F.C. managers
Hapoel Rishon LeZion F.C. managers
FC Ural Yekaterinburg managers
FC Elista managers
FC Torpedo Moscow managers
FC Saturn Ramenskoye managers
FC Chornomorets Odesa managers
FC Rostov managers
FC Akhmat Grozny managers
Russian Premier League managers
Expatriate football managers in Bolivia
Expatriate football managers in Israel
Expatriate football managers in Ukraine
Azerbaijani expatriate sportspeople in Bolivia
Azerbaijani expatriate sportspeople in Israel
Azerbaijani expatriate sportspeople in Ukraine
FC Rotor Volgograd managers
Ukrainian Premier League managers
Footballers from Baku
Association football forwards
Neftçi PFK players